Sodus Outer Light is a lighthouse at the end of the western of the two piers defining the channel from Lake Ontario into Sodus Bay, New York, first established in 1858. In 1938, the wood tower was replaced with the current cast iron structure, and the light was converted from kerosene to electricity.

Gallery

References

Lighthouses completed in 1858
Lighthouses completed in 1938
Lighthouses in New York (state)
Buildings and structures in Wayne County, New York
Transportation in Wayne County, New York
Lighthouses of the Great Lakes